Psyllobora vigintiduopunctata (often abbreviated to Psyllobora 22-punctata), the 22-spot ladybird, (earlier known as Thea vigintiduopunctata) is a common, 3–5 mm long ladybird native to Europe . The elytra are yellow in colour with 22 black spots. The pronotum is yellow or white with 5 black spots.  Unlike most other ladybirds which feed on aphids, P. 22-punctata eats mildew — especially from umbellifers and low-growing shrubs . The 22-spot ladybird is best looked for amongst low vegetation.

References

Coccinellidae
Beetles of Europe
Beetles described in 1758
Articles containing video clips
Taxa named by Carl Linnaeus